Spokane–Coeur d'Alene combined statistical area, officially the Spokane–Spokane Valley–Coeur d'Alene, WA–ID CSA as defined by the United States Census Bureau, is a combined statistical area that comprises the Spokane metropolitan area and the Coeur d'Alene metropolitan area. The population was 734,218 as of 2019. It is the 71st largest Combined Statistical Area in the United States, and is the economic and cultural center of the Inland Northwest. The CSA is anchored by Spokane and its largest satellite, Coeur d'Alene, which are separated by suburbs that largely follow the path of the Spokane Valley and Rathdrum Prairie.

Demographics
According to the American Community Survey 1-year estimates (ACS 2016), as of 2016, there were 710,575 people and 276,473 households residing within the CSA. The racial makeup of the MSA was 85.5% White, 1.4% African American, 1.5% Native American, 1.9% Asian, 0.4% Pacific Islander, 0.1% from other races, and 3.2% from two or more races. Hispanic or Latino of any race were 5% of the population.

The median income for a household in the MSA was $52,596, and about 13.7% of the population lived below the poverty line (including 17.3% of people under the age of 18 and 7.9% of people over the age of 65). The per capita income for the CSA was $27,860.

References

Spokane, Washington
Coeur d'Alene, Idaho
Spokane County, Washington
Stevens County, Washington
Pend Oreille County, Washington
Kootenai County, Idaho
Combined statistical areas of the United States